Lidice Larrea (born c.1973) is an Ecuadorian politician. Following the 2016 earthquake she became a minister.

Life
Larrea was born in Calceta in about 1973. She joined the Alianza País movement and she was elected to represent the province of Manabi.

Following the 16 April 2016 earthquake she was soon involved in relief work. She became the Minister of Economic and Social Inclusion in early May. President Rafael Correa replaced Betty Tola with Larrea. Larrea had been president of the Commission for Economic, Productive and Microenterprise Development and she could not be replaced in that role by her vice president Juan Carlos Cassinelli as he was also moved at the same time.

Larrea was able to announce some money to support victims on 25 May, and the following week she was thanking the World Food Programme for their assistance.

References

1973 births
Living people
Members of the National Assembly (Ecuador)
Women members of the National Assembly (Ecuador)